= Pocket prairie =

A pocket prairie is a small, artificially created, self-sustaining area of land where forbs and plants predominate. Oftentimes these plants are native. Pocket prairies are typically found in urban and suburban areas where there exists a lack of vegetation and wildlife (e.g. vacant lots, backyards, green spaces). These parcels of land serve as a habitat for nearby bird, insect, and mammal species.

== Benefits ==
Pocket prairies provide the benefits of:

- Improves bee populations
- Increases the number of native plants
- Improve soil health
- Filter runoff water
- Habitat for nearby species
- Aesthetic and spiritual values

== The Cleveland Pocket Prairie Project ==
As a result of economic and population decline, thousands of vacant lots are dispersed in Cleveland, Ohio. From the abundance of these lots came The Cleveland Pocket Prairie Project, an Ohio State University-led project which aims to repurpose 64 vacant lots with 8 distinct plant communities referred to as "pocket prairies". The project employs 8 different treatment methods to create plant communities, two of which use existing vegetation while the rest introduce plant mixes. This project took place in eight Cleveland neighborhoods: Glenville, Slavic Village, Buckeye, Central, Tremont/Clark Fulton, Fairfax, and Hough.
